The FLACC scale or Face, Legs, Activity, Cry, Consolability scale  is a measurement used to assess pain for children between the ages of 2 months and 7 years or individuals that are unable to communicate their pain. The scale is scored in a range of 0–10 with 0 representing no pain. The scale has five criteria, which are each assigned a score of 0, 1 or 2.

The FLACC scale has also been found to be accurate for use with adults in intensive-care units (ICU) who are unable to speak due to intubation.  The FLACC scale offered the same evaluation of pain as did the Checklist of Nonverbal Pain Indicators (CNPI) scale which is used in ICUs.

References 

Pain
Pain scales
Symptoms